Chris Óg Jones (born 1998) is an Irish Gaelic footballer who plays at club level with Iveleary and at inter-county level with the Cork senior football team. He usually lines out as a forward.

Career

Jones first played competitive Gaelic football with the Iveleary club in Inchigeelagh and, after progressing through the juvenile and underage ranks, he soon joined the club's top adult team. He enjoyed his first major success when the club won the Cork JAFC title in 2020, with Jones ending the campaign as top scorer. This success was followed by claiming the Cork IAFC title in 2021. Jones first appeared on the inter-county scene with the Cork minor football team in 2016 before later linking up with the under-20 side. He was first selected for the Cork senior football team for the pre-season McGrath Cup competition in 2022 and later earned inclusion on the team's National League panel.

Career statistics

Honours

Iveleary
Cork Intermediate A Football Championship: 2021
Cork Junior A Football Championship: 2020
Mid Cork Junior A Football Championship: 2015, 2018, 2019, 2020

References

1998 births
Living people
Iveleary Gaelic footballers
Muskerry Gaelic footballers
Cork inter-county Gaelic footballers